Main Source was an East Coast hip hop group based in New York City/Toronto, composed of Toronto-born DJs and producers, K-Cut and Sir Scratch, and Queens MC and producer Large Professor. Later, another Queens MC, Mikey D (Michael Deering), replaced Large Professor.

History
Main Source was founded in 1989. The group's first album, Breaking Atoms, released in July 1991, featured tracks such as "Looking at the Front Door", "Just a Friendly Game of Baseball", and "Watch Roger Do His Thing", as well as the first on-record appearance of Nas on "Live at the Barbeque," which also featured Joe Fatal and Akinyele. Because of business differences, the group broke up before its second album, tentatively titled The Science could be released. However, Sir Scratch and K-Cut released a second album under the Main Source name titled Fuck What You Think, with new recruit Michael Deering aka Mikey D on vocals & featured another first on-record appearance for The Dog Pack which would later become the Yonkers rap group The LOX on "Set It Off"; however, the album was shelved due to inner conflicts between Wild Pitch Records and group management., The singer Madonna sampled the bassline from "What You Need" on Fuck What You Think in her song "Human Nature," which appeared on her 1994 album, Bedtime Stories.

Prior to Main Source, Mikey D was also one third of the Laurelton, Queens-based hip hop group Mikey D & The L.A. Posse. The group also consisted of DJ Johnnie Quest and legendary engineer/producer Paul C (who was also the mentor of Large Professor). In 1988, Mikey D was also the winner of the New Music Seminar battle for world supremacy. 

Large Professor went on to be an instrumental producer for hip hop stars such as Eric B. & Rakim, Pete Rock & CL Smooth, Nas, and Diamond D.  He references his falling-out with Sir Scratch and K-Cut on A Tribe Called Quest's third album Midnight Marauders. On the track "Keep It Rollin'" he says, "I'm Uptown chillin', takin in this Grandmaster Vic blend/from the projects, the PJ's, fuck them two DJ's; Self mission."

K-Cut also produced for a wide range of hip hop artists including Big Pun, Maestro Fresh-Wes, Fu-Schnickens, Queen Latifah, and even NBA star Shaquille O'Neal. He also mentored another Toronto-based producer named Watts.

On December 22, 2002, at a concert in Toronto, the original members of Main Source performed together for the first time in nearly 10 years.

Breaking Atoms was named as one of two jury vote winners, alongside Buffy Sainte-Marie's It's My Way!, of the Polaris Heritage Prize at the 2020 Polaris Music Prize.

Discography

Studio albums
 Breaking Atoms (1991)
 Fuck What You Think (1994)

Singles
"Think" (1989)
"Looking at the Front Door" (1990)
"Watch Roger Do His Thing" (1990)
"Just Hangin' Out" (1991)
"Peace Is Not the Word to Play" (1991)
"Fakin' the Funk" (1992)
"What You Need" (1993)

Guest appearances
 The Brand New Heavies - "Bonafide Funk" from Heavy Rhyme Experience, Vol. 1 (1992)

Charts

References

External links
Main Source at MySpace
 

African-American musical groups
Musical groups established in 1989
Musical groups disestablished in 1994
Musical groups from Toronto
Hip hop groups from New York City
Canadian hip hop groups
Wild Pitch Records artists
EMI Records artists
1989 establishments in Ontario
1994 disestablishments in Ontario